Manjula Guruge (born 14 February 1981) is a Sri Lankan-born cricketer who played for the United Arab Emirates national cricket team. He played for the United Arab Emirates in the 2014 Cricket World Cup Qualifier tournament.

He played his first One Day International (ODI) at Bert Sutcliffe Oval in 2014 ICC Cricket World Cup Qualifier final against Scotland where he took 3/67 in 41 runs lost. He was selected for 2014 ICC World Twenty20 in Bangladesh. He made his Twenty20 International (T20I) debut against Netherlands at Sylhet Stadium.

References

1981 births
Living people
Emirati cricketers
United Arab Emirates One Day International cricketers
United Arab Emirates Twenty20 International cricketers
People from Ambalangoda
Cricketers at the 2015 Cricket World Cup
Sri Lankan emigrants to the United Arab Emirates
Sri Lankan expatriate sportspeople in the United Arab Emirates